Hosadurga is a town in the Chitradurga district in the Indian state of Karnataka. It is the Taluk centre of the tehsil with the same name.

Geography
Hosadurga is located in Karnataka, India, with an average elevation of 739 meters (2424 feet) above sea level.

Demographics
As of the 2011 India census, Hosadurga has a population of 28,370. Males constitute 52% of the population and females 48%.  Hosadurga has an average literacy rate of 72%, higher than the national average of 59.5%, with a male literacy rate of 76% and a female literacy rate of 70%.  In Hosadurga, 12% of the population is under seven years of age.

Industries

1) Hosadurga also had a strong cement industry in the 1990s, but many factories have closed over time due to shortages of limestone. Currently only one remains, the Ramco Cement Factory in Mathodu Village.

See also
Huliyar
Hagalavadi
Bukkapatna
Gubbi
Birur

References

Cities and towns in Chitradurga district